The Troja Bridge (2014) is a bowstring arch bridge in Prague that crosses the Vltava river. It opened to traffic in October 2014. It was designed by Mott MacDonald and Koucky Architects, and was constructed by Metrostav. It connects the districts of Troja and Holešovice. The bridge is noted for slender arch and low height-to-span ratio.

References

2014 establishments in the Czech Republic
Bridges completed in 2014
Bridges in Prague
Bridges over the Vltava
Network arch bridges
21st-century architecture in the Czech Republic